Estadio Alberto Gallardo is a football stadium in the Rimac District of Lima, Peru, named after Alberto Gallardo, a former Peruvian football player and manager who played several years for Sporting Cristal. It is the home of football club Sporting Cristal. The stadium was built in the 1960s along the Rímac River for local football use and originally named Estadio San Martín de Porres. Many clubs playing in the Primera División, Segunda División, and district leagues of San Martín de Porres were among the many tenants the stadium had. In 1995, Sporting Cristal—one of the regular first division tenants of the stadium—decided to lease the venue from the Instituto Peruano del Deporte for 17 years. In 2012 the club signed a new lease contract for 10 years and will expire in 2022. The stadium itself has hosted few high-risk matches due to the limited access to the stadium and the low capacity of 11,600.

History
The football stadium was built in the 1960s for the practice of association football in Lima. The venue was regularly used for matches in the Segunda División and the district leagues of Lima. In 1979, Sporting Cristal began to host its home matches in the San Martín de Porres and again between 1983 and 1985. In the middle of 1995, Sporting Cristal signed an agreement with the Instituto Peruano de Deportes which would lease the stadium to the club. The club then invested $200,000 in the stadium for renovations which included grass imported from the Netherlands. On 24 September 1995, the stadium re-opened its doors to a first division match between Sporting Cristal and Cienciano, where Cristal defeated Cienciano 6–0.

The stadium had a total capacity of 20,000 spectators in its four stands in the 1960s but it has been reduced up to 11,600 due to the safety regulations in the Peruvian 30037 law against violence in sport events. The southern stand overlooks the cliff of the Rímac River. This stand is not open to the public. The restriction of this stand has prevented high-risk matches from being hosted in recent times, notably against rivals Alianza Lima and Universitario de Deportes which are customarily played in the Estadio Nacional. In 2010, Sporting Cristal took advantage of the ongoing renovation of the Estadio Nacional to play rivals Alianza and Universitario in their home stadium. In May 2012, Sporting Cristal was able to legally change the name of the stadium from Estadio San Martín de Porres to Estadio Alberto Gallardo, which is the name of an iconic former player of the club following the signing of the new ten-year lease.

International Matches

References

San Martin de Porres
Sporting Cristal
Sports venues in Lima
Multi-purpose stadiums in Peru